Johan Paul, Count of Limburg-Stirum (2 February 1873 – 17 April 1948) was a Dutch diplomat, member of the House of Limburg-Stirum, Governor-General of the Dutch East Indies (1916–1921), Dutch ambassador to Germany (1925–1936) and to the United Kingdom (1936–1939).

Biography 
Johan Paul van Limburg Stirum was born on 2 February 1873 in Zwolle in the Netherlands.

He made a rapid career as a diplomat of the Netherlands and was, among others, envoy in China and Sweden.

Due to his knowledge of Asia, the government Cort van der Linden named him in 1916 Gouverneur General of the Dutch East Indies. He worked for a greater autonomy of the Dutch East Indies and for the economic development of the colony. As Governor General he adhered to the Dutch Ethical Policy and conducted administrative reforms, such as the extension of the powers of the parliament (Volksraad) of the Dutch East Indies and decentralisation of the colonial administration.

He worked in good terms with minister Idenburg, but had a difficult relationship with minister Andries Cornelis Dirk de Graeff, who was an old friend from their days at Leiden University. After his departure from the Dutch East Indies he was sent to Egypt.

In 1925, he was sent to Berlin as Dutch ambassador for Germany. He was a strong opponent of the nazi regime and refused to meet Hitler or any member of the NSDAP. From 1936 to his retirement in 1939 he was Dutch ambassador to the United Kingdom.

He died on 17 April 1948 in The Hague.

References

External links 
 

1873 births
1948 deaths
Governors-General of the Dutch East Indies
Johan Paul van Limburg Stirum
Dutch nobility
People from Zwolle
Dutch people of German descent
20th-century Dutch East Indies people
Ambassadors of the Netherlands to Germany
Ambassadors of the Netherlands to the United Kingdom